Sprong is a surname. Notable people with the surname include:

 Daniel Sprong (born 1997), Dutch ice hockey player
 Russell Sprong (1894–1956), American football and basketball coach
 Teunis Sprong (1889–1971), Dutch long-distance runner